W.C. Brown Apartment Building was a historic apartment building located at Winston-Salem, Forsyth County, North Carolina.  It was built about 1941, and was a two-story brick-veneered rectangular block structure.  It had a hipped roof and exposed rafter ends in the Bungalow / American Craftsman style. The building was built as rental apartments for African-American families just before World War II.  The building housed workers at the nearby R. J. Reynolds Tobacco Company. The building has been demolished.

It was listed on the National Register of Historic Places in 1998.

References

African-American history in Winston-Salem, North Carolina
Residential buildings on the National Register of Historic Places in North Carolina
Residential buildings completed in 1941
Buildings and structures in Winston-Salem, North Carolina
National Register of Historic Places in Winston-Salem, North Carolina
20th-century disestablishments in North Carolina
Buildings and structures demolished in the 20th century
Demolished buildings and structures in North Carolina